Christina Johansen (born 17 July 1992) is a Danish rower.

She won a medal at the 2019 World Rowing Championships.

References

External links

1992 births
Living people
Danish female rowers
World Rowing Championships medalists for Denmark
Place of birth missing (living people)
Rowers at the 2020 Summer Olympics